The men's 400 metres event  at the 1975 European Athletics Indoor Championships was held on 8 and 9 March in Katowice.

Medalists

Results

Heats
Held on 8 March.First 2 from each heat (Q) and the next 2 fastest (q) qualified for the semifinals.

Semifinals
Held on 8 March.First 2 from each heat (Q) qualified directly for the final.

Note: Only two athletes started in semifinal 2 because the other two were not informed about it. A special third heat was run on 9 March to let those compete for one extra spot in the final.

Final
Held on 9 March.

References

400 metres at the European Athletics Indoor Championships
400